WD repeat-containing protein 72 is a protein that in humans is encoded by the WDR72 gene. WDR72 contains 7 WD40 repeats, which are predicted to form the blades of a 7 beta propeller structure.

Clinical significance 

Mutations in this gene cause autosomal-recessive hypomaturation amelogenesis imperfecta.

References

Further reading